XTC is an English band.

XTC may also refer to:

Music
 XTC (album), a 1996 album by Anthony Hamilton
 "XTC" (Elgar), a 1930 song by Elgar
 "X-T-C", a song by Accept from Eat the Heat
 "XTC, the opening theme to the Witchblade anime series, performed by Psychic Lover
 "XTC Acid", a song by SOPHIE from Oil of Every Pearl's Un-Insides Non-Stop Remix Album

Other uses
 MDMA or XTC, an empathogenic drug
 Diehl AeroNautical XTC Hydrolight, an ultralight aircraft

See also
 Ecstasy (disambiguation)
 Ivans Xtc, a 2000 film by Bernard Rose
 XML Telemetric and Command Exchange (XTCE), a format for spacecraft telemetry and command meta-data